Drogon may refer to:

People 
Drogon, the name of several medieval individuals, which is typically spelled "Drogo" in English; see Drogo (disambiguation)
Drogön Chögyal Phagpa, the fifth leader of the Sakya school of Tibetan Buddhism

Arts, entertainment, and media
 Drogon (Game of Thrones), one of the three dragons hatched by Daenerys Targaryen in the Game of Thrones franchise
 Drogon, one of the three dragons hatched by Daenerys Targaryen in the A Song of Ice and Fire books by G.R.R. Martin
Drogon, the debut novel of Arthur van Schendel

Other uses
 Drogon (software), a C++14/17-based HTTP application framework
Pseudocalotes drogon, Drogon’s false garden lizard, a species of agamid lizard, found in Malaysia

See also
Dragon
Drogen
Droggn
Drogoman
Drogoni%C3%B3w